PO'ed is a video game developed by Any Channel for the 3DO Interactive Multiplayer and published by Any Channel in 1995. It follows a cook attempting to escape a hostile, alien world. A PlayStation port was released in May 1996 by Accolade. An MS-DOS version was cancelled.

Plot
A chef's spacecraft has crash-landed on an alien world and must escape.

Gameplay

PO'ed is a first-person shooter using primitive weapons such as a frying pan and a drill. The player must advance through 26 levels filled with alien monsters. A jet-pack is also available to facilitate the player's exploration of levels.

Development
PO'ed began development in October 1993, initially as a spare-time project. Russel Pflughaupt of Any Channel recalled, "We looked at games like Doom, Marathon, and Dark Forces, and took what we felt were their best elements. But we wanted to get away from the tunnel-based feel of those games, so we made the environments in PO'ed very open, and not formulaic at all."

The team originally wanted to include a motorcycle and a tank for the player character to ride in addition to the jet pack, but couldn't find a way to incorporate their use into the level designs.

Reception

PO'ed met with polarizing opinions among critics. Reviewing the 3DO version, Scary Larry of GamePro commented that the game has serious control problems, with the character often careening off edges or failing to turn at crucial moments. He nonetheless concluded that the game sufficiently fills the role of first-person shooter for the 3DO, citing the unique assortment of weapons, aggressive enemy AI, sense of humor, and relatively strong graphics. Maximum summarized the game as the "worst 3D action title ever seen on any format, with the exception of PlayStation Crime Crackers and some early PC public domain games." They elaborated that the 3D environments constantly glitch, the floors are untextured, the attempts at humor are feeble, enemies show heavy pixelation even at medium distances, and the controls are extremely poor. 

A reviewer for Next Generation noted that PO'ed began as an independent project by a small group of programmers, and said that its "labor of love" nature "is both a blessing and a curse." He elaborated that the game plays smoothly, doesn't limit the player to just walking to get around, and generally stands out from other first person shooters, but that "the meticulously over designed level layouts" and intricate textures often make the game confusing to the point of frustration. He concluded, "It's well done, very well done, but too tricky for its own good."

Reviewing the PlayStation version, most of the four reviewers of Electronic Gaming Monthly felt that PO'ed was a dull first-person shooter with nothing to set it apart from other games in the genre save for its sense of humor, which quickly wears thin. Mark Lefebvre also criticized the lack of improvement over the 3DO version. Mike Desmond, in a dissenting opinion, called PO'ed "an all-around good title that ranks highly among titles such as Doom and Duke Nukem 3D." He praised the detailed graphics, variety of "topsy turvy" level designs, and large selection of weapons. In GamePro, Slo Mo said that the game lacks the terror and atmosphere of games like Doom and Alien Trilogy, but "does a nice job of tip-toeing between fierce and funny." He particularly commented on the aggressive enemy AI and unique weapons. Next Generation said that the PlayStation version retains the bizarre style and overall experience of the 3DO original while making it easier to play, due to better controls and graphics while more clearly delineate the extremely intricate levels.

References

External links
 PO'ed at GameFAQs
 PO'ed at Giant Bomb
 PO'ed at Hardcore Gaming 101
 Fan site

1995 video games
3DO Interactive Multiplayer games
Accolade (company) games
Cancelled DOS games
First-person shooters
PlayStation (console) games
Sprite-based first-person shooters
Video games about extraterrestrial life
Video games developed in the United States
Video games with 2.5D graphics